Night of Mystery (German: Rätsel einer Nacht) is a 1927 German silent thriller film directed by Harry Piel and starring Harry Piel, Dary Holm, and Josef Peterhans. It was shot at the Staaken Studios in Berlin. The film's sets were designed by the art director Willi Herrmann.

Cast
 Harry Piel as Herry Debus, ein Sportsmann 
 Dary Holm as Komtesse Elga Almen 
 Josef Peterhans as Graf Egar von Almen 
 Walter Steinbeck as Prof. Bieler, Leiter einer Nervenanstalt 
 Julius Falkenstein as Bodo Donnersheim 
 Charly Berger as Der Schatten 
 Hugo Fischer-Köppe
 Alfred Loretto
 Ilse Herzberg
 Hans Heinrich von Twardowski
 Hugo Döblin
 Lotte Fritsch
 Friedrich Berger
 Marianne Stanior
 Eva Schmid-Kayser
 Boris Michailow

References

Bibliography
 Hans-Michael Bock and Tim Bergfelder. The Concise Cinegraph: An Encyclopedia of German Cinema. Berghahn Books, 2009.

External links

1927 films
1920s thriller films
German thriller films
Films of the Weimar Republic
German silent feature films
Films directed by Harry Piel
Bavaria Film films
Nero-Film films
Films shot at Staaken Studios
Silent thriller films
1920s German films
1920s German-language films